Amata fruhstorferi is a moth of the subfamily Arctiinae. It was described by George Hampson in 1898. It is found on Sulawesi.

References

fruhstorferi
Moths of Indonesia